Macrothylacia rubi, the fox moth, is a lepidopteran belonging to the family Lasiocampidae. It was first described by Carl Linnaeus in his 1758 10th edition of Systema Naturae.

Distribution and habitat
This species can be found from Western Europe to Central Asia and Siberia. These moths live in open woodlands, moors and prairies.

Description
The wingspan of the male is 40–65 mm. The wings are reddish brown in males while females are usually paler, more greyish in colour and slightly larger than males. Both sexes show two narrow, straight, light-yellow, transverse bands, running across the forewings. The abdomen is thick, grey brown and hairy. They are initially black with bright yellow or orange segments, later they become darker, always covered with blackish and tawny-coloured hairs and with light grey hair on the sides.

Biology
It is a univoltine species. Between September and March the caterpillars hibernate in leaf litter. These moths take flight from May to July. The males usually fly in the afternoon and night, while the females fly only at night. Caterpillars feed on heather (Calluna) bramble (Rubus fruticosus), Gramineae, Betula verrucosa, Salix, Populus tremula, Vicia cracca, Trifolium medium, Trifolium pratense, Vaccinium myrtillus, Fragaria, Potentilla and Geranium sylvaticum.

Gallery

References

External links

 Lepiforum.de
 Schmetterling-raupe.de

Lasiocampinae
Moths described in 1758
Moths of Asia
Moths of Europe
Taxa named by Carl Linnaeus